Mikhinsky is a rural locality (a settlement) in Kamenno-Stepnoye Rural Settlement, Talovsky District, Voronezh Oblast, Russia. The population was 613 as of 2010. There are 5 streets.

References 

Rural localities in Talovsky District